Otto Karl Wiesenburg (August 1, 1911 – June 18, 1990) was an American legislator, lawyer, and public servant. He was a member of the Mississippi House of Representatives from 1956 to 1964 and held various other roles in public service for Pascagoula and Jackson County, Mississippi. Wiesenburg is best known for his opposition to Mississippi Governor Ross Barnett's attempt to deny the enrollment of James Meredith into the University of Mississippi. The articles detailed the applicable federal and state laws that had been violated and stated that the Governor's action had followed "the road to riot" and that the resulting bloodshed in Oxford was the "price of defiance." Ira B. Harkey Jr. editor of The Chronicle won the Pulitzer Prize for Editorial Writing in 1963 for his anti-segregationist editorials and reporting of the James Meredith incident. Others also took notice of Wiesenburg's strong stand for the rule of law. Attorney General Robert F. Kennedy wrote of Wiesenburg in a letter to the federal attorney in Oxford, "Tell [Wiesenburg] for me that he is the one who deserves a Pulitzer Prize or more.  It is all well for we in the North to talk about these matters. That takes no courage at all.  But people such as you and Mr. Wiesenburg are the ones who really carry the banner." Former Mississippi Governor William Winter described Wiesenburg as "one of the most courageous men he ever knew."

While he did not attend college, unknown to his family until after his death, he paid for many students to attend colleges throughout the state.  His family has established the Karl Wiesenburg Scholarship at the University of Southern Mississippi to honor his commitment to education and public service.  The scholarship is available to University of Southern Mississippi students majoring in political science with preference for a student from Jackson County.

References

External links
 The Fight for Men’s Minds: The Aftermath of the Ole Miss Riot of 1962 by Charles W. Eagle
 Learning the Price of Defiance in Pascagoula by Alda Talley
 

1911 births
1990 deaths
20th-century American lawyers
20th-century American politicians
United States Army personnel of World War II
Democratic Party members of the Mississippi House of Representatives
Mississippi lawyers
People from Pascagoula, Mississippi
People from Rosedale, Queens
United States Army officers